The Chuvash Wikipedia is the Chuvash language edition of Wikipedia. It was founded on November 22, 2004. Its 50,000th article was created in October 2022.

Policies
Difficult issues are resolved through the Arbitration Committee, which handles content disputes, blocks users or prohibits certain users from editing articles on certain topics.
Administrators (currently 2) are elected through a vote; administrators who have become inactive (i.e. have not used administrative tools, such as "delete" or "block" buttons, at least 25 times in six months) may lose their privileges by an Arbitration Committee decision.

History

The Chuvash Wikipedia was created on November 22, 2004. Jimmy Wales used it at Wikimania 2009 as an example of the value of Wikipedia for the languages on the verge of extinction.

Timeline
 On December 16, 2004, the main page was created.
 On March 9, 2006,  the 2,000th article was created.
 On August 22, 2006, the 4,000th article was created.
 On November 22, 2006, the 4,500th article was created.
 In January 2007, the 5,000th article was created.
 In September 2007, the 6,000th article was created.
 On January 14, 2008, the 7,000th article was created.
 On July 17, 2008, the 8,000th article was created.
 On April 6, 2009, the 10,000th article was created.
 On February 13, 2010, the 11,000th article was created.
 On October 4, 2010, the 11,451st article was created.
 On August 31, 2011, the 13,000th article was created.
 On October 6, 2012, the 14,000th article (firm train "Chuvashia") was created.
 On December 3, 2013, the 20,000th article was created.
 On August 1, 2014, the 30,000th article was created.
 On March 3, 2016, the 34,100th article was created.
 On November 11, 2016, the 36,000th article was created.
 On March 28, 2017, the 39,000th article was created.
 On October 17, 2022 the 50,000th article was created.

Content
Source: Нумай каçăллă категорисем

See also 
 Chuvash National Movement
 ChuvashTet
 Chuvash national radio
 List of Chuvashes
 Society for the study of the native land
 Chuvash National Congress

References

External links

 Chuvash Language Wikipedia
 Николай Плотников: "Родное лучше видится на расстоянии..."
 Александр Блинов: "Пользование технологией вики становится нормой"
 Статистика Чувашской Википедии
 В списке  языковых Википедий
 "Киләчәген кайгырткан халык үз телен һәм мәдәниятен үстерүгә акча табарга тиеш"

Wikipedias by language
Chuvash-language mass media
Wikipedia articles licensed under the GNU Free Document License
Chuvash people
Russian encyclopedias
Internet properties established in 2004